All Hallows RC High School is a mixed Roman Catholic secondary school in the Pendleton area of Salford, Greater Manchester, England.

It is a voluntary aided school administered by Salford City Council and the Roman Catholic Diocese of Salford. Pupils are mainly admitted from Catholic primary schools in Salford, including The Cathedral School of St Peter & St John RC in Salford, Holy Family RC Primary School in Oldham, St Boniface RC Primary School in Higher Broughton, St Joseph's RC Primary School in Ordsall, St Sebastian's RC Primary School in Pendleton and St Thomas of Canterbury RC Primary School in Higher Broughton.

All Hallows RC High School offers GCSEs, BTECs and Cambridge Nationals as programmes of study for pupils. The school also has specialisms in Business, Enterprise and Sport.

References

External links
All Hallows RC High School official website

Secondary schools in Salford
Voluntary aided schools in England
Catholic secondary schools in the Diocese of Salford